This is a timeline of events of World War II in 1939, from the start of the war on 1 September 1939. For events preceding September 1, 1939, see the timeline of events preceding World War II.

Nazi Germany's invasion of Poland on 1 September 1939, and Britain and France's declaration of war on Germany two days later marks the beginning of World War II. After the declaration of war, western Europe saw very little land or air active military confrontation at first, and the period was termed the "Phoney War". In eastern Europe, however, the agreement between the Soviet Union and Nazi Germany signed on 23 August opened the way in September for the Soviet Union's invasion of eastern Poland, which was divided between the two invaders before the end of the month. The Soviet Union starts a new military offensive by invading Finland at the end of November.

September

1: The Republic of China and the Empire of Japan are involved in the early stages of the third year of armed conflict between them during the Second Sino-Japanese War. The war is in what will be known as the "Second Period", which starts after the fall of Wuhan in October 1938 and ends in December 1941 with Pearl Harbor. This conflict will eventually be swept up into World War II when Japan joins the Axis and China joins the Allies.

1: The invasion of Poland by Germany starts at 4:45 a.m. when the Kriegsmarine'''s battleship Schleswig-Holstein opens fire on the Polish military transit depot at Westerplatte in the Free City of Danzig on the Baltic Sea, but the attack is repulsed. At the same time the Luftwaffe attacks several targets in Poland, among them Wieluń, the first town in the war to be carpet bombed by the Germans. Shortly before 6:00 a.m., the German Army passes the Polish border in great numbers from north and south, together with Slovak units. In the same day, the Free City of Danzig is annexed by Germany. Resisters entrenched in the city's Polish Post Office are overwhelmed.

1: The Italian government announces that it will maintain a condition of "non-belligerence" in the conflict.

1: Denmark, Estonia, Finland, Latvia, Norway, Romania and Sweden immediately declare their neutrality.

1: The House of Commons of the United Kingdom passes an emergency military budget.

1: The British War Secretary Leslie Hore-Belisha orders the War Office to begin the general mobilization of the British Armed Forces.

1: In a mass evacuation effort (code named  "operation Pied Piper") the British authorities relocate 1,473,000 children and adults from the cities to the countryside. The adults involved were teachers, people with disabilities and their helpers, mothers with preschool children.

1: Acting on account of their governments, the ambassadors of France and Britain demand the German government to cease all hostile activities and to withdraw its troops from Poland.

1: The President of the United States Franklin Delano Roosevelt sends an appeal to all European powers involved in the crisis asking them to abstain from bombing civilian and unfortified cities. Germany's Führer, Adolf Hitler, answers immediately assuring the American chargé d'affaires Alexander C. Kirk that the Luftwaffe will only attack military targets. The British Prime Minister Neville Chamberlain also promises to abide to the request, as does Poland's ambassador to the US Jerzy Antoni Potocki.

2: Right after Britain, the French Parliament also approves an emergency war budget.

2: The British and French governments agree on issuing an ultimatum to Germany the following day.

2: The Swiss government orders a general mobilization of its forces.

2: The Irish State's Dáil Éireann approves a state of emergency, paving the way to legislation that vastly enhances the government's powers.

2: The French Army begins its general mobilization.

3: At 9:00 a.m. the British ambassador to Berlin Nevile Henderson is instructed by the Cabinet to deliver an ultimatum to Germany which expired without answer at 11:00 a.m. As a result at 11:15 a.m. British Standard Time (BST) the Prime Minister Neville Chamberlain announces that Britain is at war with Germany.

3: The National Service (Armed Forces) Act 1939 is approved and enforces full conscription in the British Armed Forces on all able-bodied males between 18 and 41 resident in the UK.

3: In Britain, Chamberlain forms a new war ministry with a smaller and more powerful war cabinet within composed of nine ministers (Chamberlain, Sir Samuel Hoare, Sir John Simon, Lord Halifax, Leslie Hore-Belisha, Sir Kingsley Wood, Lord Chatfield, Lord Hankey and Winston Churchill). During its first meeting, the cabinet appoints general Sir Edmund Ironside as head of the Chief of the Imperial General Staff and general Viscount Gort head of the British Expeditionary Force.

3: The British Viceroy of India Lord Linlithgow also declares war on Germany without consulting Indian nationalists.

3: The Australian Prime Minister Robert Menzies declares that the country is at war with Germany due to Britain's choice, and a similar war declaration against Germany is made by New Zealand's government.

3: At 12:00 p.m. the French Government delivers a similar final ultimatum to Germany which at 5:00 p.m. also expires unanswered, thus bringing France in the war.

3: Within hours of the British declaration of War, a British cruise ship en route from Glasgow, UK, to Montreal, Canada, is torpedoed by the German submarine   Northwest of Ireland. 112 passengers and crew members are killed. The "Battle of the Atlantic" starts.

3: "Bloody Sunday": accused of having shot at Polish troops, about 1,000 ethnic German civilians are killed in the Polish city of Bydgoszcz.

3: Ireland's Taoiseach Éamon de Valera declares the nation's neutrality.

3: Netherlands and Belgium declare their neutrality.

3: German authorities order U-boats to immediately take action against all British ships, but sparing French ships and in strict observance of prize rules.

3: The Polish destroyer ORP Wicher and the minelayer ORP Gryf are sunk in the Polish port of Hel by the Luftwaffe, making them the first warships to be sunk in the war.

3: In Britain's first military action, the Royal Air Force's Bomber Command sends out 27 planes to bomb the Kriegsmarine, but they turn back before having been able to find any targets. Overnight ten Whitleys made the first of many 'nickel raids' in Bremen, Hamburg and the Ruhr in which the planes dropped propaganda leaflets.

3: Further answering to Roosevelt's plea the British and French present a joint formal declaration stating that the Allied bombers would attack only military targets unless Germany begins indiscriminate civilian bombings.

4: At 8:00 a.m. Newfoundland Standard Time (NST), Dominion of Newfoundland declares war on Germany.

4: In Poland the Third German Army from East Prussia links with units from German Western Pomerania, thus covering the Danzig Corridor.

4: In the first British raid of the war, the Royal Air Force's send 15 Blenheim bombers to launch a bombing raid on the German fleet in the Heligoland Bight. They target the German pocket-battleship Admiral Scheer and the light cruiser Emden anchored off Wilhelmshaven. Seven aircraft are lost in the attack and, although the Admiral Scheer is hit three times, all of the bombs fail to explode.

4: Japan's Prime Minister Nobuyuki Abe announces its country's neutrality in the European situation.

4: Spain's caudillo Francisco Franco states that he will observe "strict neutrality" in the conflict.

4: Lithuania proclaims its neutrality in the conflict.

4: The South African Prime Minister Barry Hertzog motion to remain neutral in the war  is defeated in the Assembly 80 votes against 67. At this point, Hertzog goes to the Governor-General Patrick Duncan and asks him to call a new election, which Duncan refuses.

4: The first advance parties of the British Expeditionary Force arrive in France.

4: After the sinking of the Athenia Hitler forbids any attack on passenger ships.
 
5: Duncan calls on the politician Jan Smuts to attempt to form a Cabinet and replace Hertzog as Prime Minister of South Africa, which he successfully does.

5: The Kingdom of Yugoslavia states its neutrality.

5: The British freighter SS Bosnia becomes the first merchant ship sunk in the battle of the Atlantic when it gets targeted off the coast of Portugal by the U-boat U-47.

5: The United States publicly declares neutrality. On the same day the American President Franklin D. Roosevelt orders to put together a Neutrality Patrol which must observe and report any belligerent forces by patrolling the United States Atlantic coast and the Caribbean.

6: South Africa, now under Prime Minister Jan Smuts, declares war on Germany.

6: In the so-called battle of Barking Creek, a friendly fire incident, due to the misidentification as hostile of an incoming team of eleven Hurricanes, two aircraft are shot down and the first British fighter pilot killed.

6: The German army occupies Kraków in the south of Poland; Polish army is in general retreat.

6: As a protection against U-boats, the Admiralty orders to adopt the convoy system.

6: The British fleet starts the naval blockade on shipping directed to Germany by the implementation of the Northern Patrol.

7: France's commander in chief general Maurice Gamelin begins a limited offensive into the German Saarland territory involving ten divisions.

7: The National Registration Act 1939 is passed in Britain introducing identity cards and allowing the government to control labour.

8: Britain establishes the Ministry of Food to monitor the supply and distribution of food.

8: Roosevelt proclaims "a limited national emergency", increasing military spending and expanding the size of the United States Armed Forces.

8: The Germans begin what will be the systematic mining of the British waters by the mining of Portland Harbour.

9: The French Saar Offensive stalls at the heavily mined Warndt Forest having advanced approximately  into lightly defended German territory.

10: After passing both Houses of the Canadian parliament by unanimous consent Canada's Prime Minister W. L. Mackenzie King declares war on Germany.

10: Warsaw is hit for the first time by bombing raids. In just that single day twelve raids target the city.

10: The first submarine is sunk in the conflict when the British submarine HMS Triton sinks the British submarine HMS Oxley mistaking her for a U-Boat, leaving only two survivors.

11: Viceroy of India Lord Linlithgow announces to the two houses of the Indian Legislature (the Council of State and the Legislative Assembly) that due to India's participation in the war, the plans for the Federation of India under the Government of India Act 1935 will be indefinitely postponed.

12: General Gamelin orders to halt to the French Saar Offensive into Germany after having taken only a handful of villages.

13: The French Navy suffers its first casualties in Casablanca, Morocco, when the minelaying cruiser Pluton explodes due to an accident killing 215 people.

14: British Destroyers escorting the aircraft carrier  sink the U-39 after the U-boat's torpedoes against the carrier didn't explode. All crew members were rescued and taken prisoner. It was the first sinking of a German U-boat in WW II.

15: The Polish Army is ordered to hold out at the Romanian border until the Allies arrive.

15: The Kingdom of Bulgaria formally announces its neutrality.

16: The German Army complete the encirclement of Warsaw.

16: The first eastbound transatlantic convoy sets sail from Halifax, Canada, towards Liverpool, UK. 357 such HX convoys will follow.

17: The Soviet Union invades Poland from the east, occupying the territory east of the Curzon line as well as Białystok and Eastern Galicia.

17: The British aircraft carrier HMS Courageous is torpedoed and sunk by U-29 on patrol off the coast of Ireland, causing the death of 514 aboard; it represented the first major warship to be sunk in the war.

17: The Imperial Japanese Army launches attacks on the Chinese city of Changsha, when their forces in northern Jiangxi attacked westward toward Henan.

18: Polish President Ignacy Mościcki and Commander-in-Chief Edward Rydz-Śmigły leave Poland for Romania, where they are both interned; Russian forces reach Vilnius and Brest-Litovsk. Polish submarine Orzeł escapes from Tallinn; Estonia's neutrality is questioned by the Soviet Union and Germany.

18: The French Army completes its sixteen-day long mobilization.

19: The German and Soviet armies link up near Brest Litovsk.

19: Soviet Union blockades the harbour of Tallinn, the capital of Estonia.

19: The Japanese Imperial Army attacks the Chinese National Revolutionary Army along the Xinqiang River using poison gas during the Battle of Changsha.

21: Romanian Prime Minister Armand Călinescu is assassinated by the Iron Guard, an ultra-nationalistic group in Romania.

23: The Imperial Japanese Army drive the Chinese National Revolutionary Army out of the Xiangjiang River area, and the 6th and 13th Divisions cross the river under artillery cover and advances further south along the Miluo River during the Battle of Changsha.

24: The Führer der Unterseeboote Karl Dönitz greatly relaxes prize rules ordering the sinking without warning of merchant ships that send signals by radio and the attack on smaller Allied passenger ships. He also opens the war on French shipping.

24: Soviet air force violates Estonian airspace. The Estonians negotiate with Molotov in Moscow. Molotov warns the Estonians that if the Soviet Union doesn't get military bases in Estonia, it will be forced to use "more radical actions".

25: German home front measures begin with food rationing.

25: At the opening in Panama City of the Pan-American conference of ministers of foreign affairs the U.S. Under Secretary of State Sumner Welles asks for their support of a Patrol Zone covering the Americas.

25: Soviet air activity in Estonia. Soviet troops along the Estonian border include 600 tanks, 600 aircraft and 160 000 men.

26: Following a massive artillery bombardment, the Germans launch a major infantry assault on the centre of Warsaw.

26: Russian bombers seen in the Tallinn sky.

26: The Luftwaffe attacks the Home Fleet between Scotland and the Skaggerak with limited success; on the occasion a Dornier Do 18 is shot down by a Fleet Air Arm Blackburn Skua from the aircraft carrier HMS Ark Royal, making it the first German plane shot down by the British.

26: Hitler orders the pocket battleships Deutschland and Admiral Graf Spee to go on a long-range rampage in the Atlantic against allied shipping, the former going to the Northern Atlantic and the latter to the Southern.

27: In the first offensive operations by the German Army in Western Europe, guns on the Siegfried Line open up on villages behind French Maginot line.

28: German–Soviet Frontier Treaty is signed by Molotov and Ribbentrop. The secret protocol specifies the details of partition of Poland originally defined in Molotov–Ribbentrop Pact (August 23, 1939) and adds Lithuania to the Soviet Union sphere of interest.

28: The remaining Polish army and militia in the centre of Warsaw capitulate to the Germans.

28: Soviet troops mass by the Latvian border. Latvian air space violated.

28: Estonia signs a 10-year Mutual Assistance Pact with the Soviet Union, which allows the Soviets to have 30 000-men military bases in Estonia. As a gift in return Stalin promises to respect Estonian independence.

29: The Japanese Imperial Army reaches the outskirts of Changsha. However, it is unable to conquer the city because its supply lines are cut off by the Chinese  National Revolutionary Army.

30: Captain Lagsdorff's Admiral Graf Spee sinks its first merchant ship, the British freighter SS Clement while off the coast of Brazil.

30: French forces on the French-German border fall back to the Maginot Line in anticipation of a German invasion.

October

1: Latvian representatives negotiate with Stalin and Molotov. Soviets threaten an occupation by force if they do not get military bases in Latvia.

2: The Declaration of Panama is approved by the American republics. Belligerent activities should not take place within waters adjacent to the American continent.

3: British forces move to take over part of the frontier defenses manned by French troops.

3: Lithuanians meet Stalin and Molotov in Moscow. Stalin offers Lithuania the city of Vilnius (in Poland) in return for allowing Soviet military bases in Lithuania. The Lithuanians are reluctant.

4: The French forces retreat from the Saarland in Germany, and return behind the Maginot Line.

5: Latvia signs a 10-year Mutual Assistance Pact with the Soviet Union, which allows the Soviets to have 25,000 men in military bases in Latvia. Stalin promises to respect Latvian independence.

5: Reacting to the news that German surface raiders are targeting commercial shipping, the British First Sea Lord Sir Dudley Pound orders to create together with the French eight hunting forces to scout the Atlantic and destroy the surface raiders.

6: Chinese army reportedly defeats the Japanese at the Battle of Changsha.

6: Polish resistance in the Polish September Campaign comes to an end. Hitler speaks before the Reichstag, declaring a desire for a conference with Britain and France to restore peace.

9: Germany issues orders (Case Yellow) to prepare for the invasion of Belgium, France, Luxembourg, and the Netherlands.

9: The German cruiser Deutschland seizes the American freighter SS City of Flint and its crew, accusing them of contraband. Led by a prize crew the ship is ordered to go to Germany, causing a diplomatic incident with the United States and igniting American public opinion.

10: The last of Poland's military surrenders to the Germans.

10: The leaders of the German navy suggest to Hitler they need to occupy Norway.

10: British Prime Minister Chamberlain formally declines Hitler's peace offer in a speech held in the House of Commons.

10: Lithuania signs a 15-year Mutual Assistance Pact with the Soviet Union, which allows the Soviets to have 20,000 men in military bases in Lithuania. In a secret protocol, Vilnius is made Lithuanian territory.

11: An estimated 158,000 British troops are now in France.

12: Adolf Eichmann starts deporting Jews from Austria and Czechoslovakia into Poland.

12: French Premier Édouard Daladier declines Hitler's offer of peace.

12: Finland's representatives meet Stalin and Molotov in Moscow. Soviet Union demands Finland give up a military base near Helsinki  and exchange some Soviet and Finnish territories to protect Leningrad against Great Britain or the eventual future threat of Germany.

13: In the midst of the night the  under the command of Günther Prien infiltrates in the Scapa Flow harbour and sinks the British battleship , killing 833 crewmen.

14: Finns meet Stalin again. Stalin tells that "an accident" might happen between Finnish and Soviet troops, if the negotiations last too long.

16: The Luftwaffe made its first air raid on Britain when it sent a dozen of Junkers Ju 88 after ships off Rosyth, in particular the battlecruiser HMS Hood. The raid was unsuccessful, failing to land any hits while the group commander Helmuth Pohle was shot down.

17: The Luftwaffe launches a new raid on Britain, this time targeting the British fleet anchored at Scapa Flow, again with limited success, with only the decommissioned HMS Iron Duke being hit.

18: First Soviet forces enter Estonia. During the Umsiedlung, 12,600 Baltic Germans leave Estonia.

19: Portions of Poland are formally inducted into Germany; the first Jewish ghetto is established at Lublin.

20: The "Phoney War": French troops settle in the Maginot line's dormitories and tunnels; the British build new fortifications along the "gap" between the Maginot line and the Channel.

20: Pope Pius XII's first encyclical condemns racism and dictatorships.

21: Registration begins in the United Kingdom in order to conscript all able-bodied males between 18 and 23.

23: The seized freighter City of Flint reaches Murmansk in the Soviet Union. Four days later it is permitted to leave still under the control of its prize crew despite the angry protests of the Roosevelt administration. The Murmansk incident would also have lasting consequences by alienating the American public opinion.

26: Germany annexes the former Polish regions of Upper Silesia, West Prussia, Pomerania, Poznan, Ciechanow (Zichenau), part of Łódź, and the Free City of Danzig and creates two new administrative districts, Danzig-West Prussia and Posen (later called District Wartheland  or Warthegau); the areas of occupied Poland not annexed directly by Germany or by the Soviet Union are placed under a German civilian administration called the Generalgouvernement.

27: Belgium announces that it is neutral in the present conflict.

28: Hitler, worried on one side of the protests received by the American and Norwegian governments and on the other of the danger of losing a warship with such a prestigious name, orders the Deutschland to return home.

30: The British government releases a report on concentration camps being built in Europe for Jews and anti-Nazis.

31: As Germany plans for an attack on France, German Lieutenant-General Erich von Manstein proposes that Germany should attack through the Ardennes rather than through Belgium – the expected attack route.

November

1: Parts of Poland, including the Danzig Corridor, are annexed by Germany. Soviet Union annexes the eastern parts of occupied Poland to Ukraine and Belorussia.
1-2: The German physicist Hans Ferdinand Mayer compiles while on a trip to Oslo the so-called Oslo Report, containing important German secret military information.
3: Finland and Soviet Union again negotiate new borders. Finns mistrust Stalin's aims and refuse to give up territory breaking their defensive line.
3: The City of Flint anchors at Haugesund, Norway, claiming medical reasons. Their anchorage without good reason in neutral waters is judged a violation of international law by Norwegian authorities that during the night board the ship freeing the ship and interning the Germans.
4: Roosevelt signs into law the amendments to the Neutrality Act: belligerents may buy arms from the United States, but on a strictly cash and carry basis, banning the use of American ships.
4: Hans Mayer sends an anonymous letter to the British Naval attaché in Oslo, Captain Hector Boyer, asking if the British wants information from Germany  on present and future German weapons. If the answer is positive he requires to be given notice through a small change of the German version of the BBC World Service, which is done.
5:  Hans Mayer sends anonymously his report to the British Embassy in Norway; from there it was sent for evaluation to Whitehall, where it attracted the attention of Reginald Victor Jones, Assistant Director of Intelligence to the Air Ministry, despite the skepticism of many who suspected it being a German plant.
6: Sonderaktion Krakau: In Krakow, Nazis detain and deport university professors to concentration camps.
8: Hitler escapes a bomb blast in a Munich beerhall, where he was speaking on the anniversary of the Beer Hall Putsch of 1923. British bombers coincidentally bomb Munich.
9: At an Anglo-French meeting held in Varennes general Gamelin obtains the approval of the Dyle plan, a strategy meant to keep the war out of France if Hitler invaded Belgium.
9: In the Venlo incident, British Secret Intelligence Service officers Sigismund Payne Best and Richard Henry Stevens fall victims to a false flag operation: at Venlo in neutral Netherlands, they are abducted by a group of German Sicherheitsdienst officers and brought to Germany.
13: Negotiations between Finland and Soviet Union break down. Finns suspect that Germans and Russians have agreed to include Finland in the Soviet sphere of influence.
13: The Deutschland arrives home at Gotenhafen, after having only sunk two ships and caught one.
14: The Polish government-in-exile moves to London.
16: The Commander-in-Chief of the German Navy Grossadmiral Erich Raeder orders his U-boats to sink without warning all Allied merchant ships.
17: The IRA is blamed for bombs set off in London.
20: The Luftwaffe and German U-boats start mining the Thames estuary.
21: The new German strategy of planting magnetic mines in the British seas obtains its first major success when a mine planted by the U-52 in the Firth of Forth put the light cruiser HMS Belfast out of service until the autumn of 1942.
21: The German battleships Gneisenau and the Scharnhorst are sent out to relieve pressure on the Admiral Graf Spee by bringing havoc on the shipping routes.
22: The Luftwaffe drops in the mud an intact magnetic mine off Shoeburyness at the mouth of the Thames Estuary. Once salvaged, Admiralty scientists invented degaussing that greatly decreased the danger represented by magnetic mines.
23: The German battleships Gneisenau and the Scharnhorst sink the British armed merchant cruiser HMS Rawalpindi between Iceland and the Faroe Islands. About 270 crewmen die, while only 38 survive.
23: Polish Jews are ordered to wear Star of David armbands.
24: Japan announces the capture of Nanning in southern China.
26: The Soviets stage the shelling of Mainila, Soviet artillery shells a field near the Finnish border, accusing Finns of killing Soviet troops.
29: The USSR breaks off diplomatic relations with Finland.
30: The Soviet Union attacks Finland in what would become known as the Winter War.

December

1: Russia continues its war against Finland; Helsinki is bombed. In the first two weeks of the month, the Finns retreat to the Mannerheim line, an outmoded defensive line just inside the southern border with Russia.
2: The Red Army takes Petsamo.
4: The British battleship HMS Nelson is incapacitated for six months by yet another magnetic mine left this time by the U-52 off the Loch Ewe.
5: The Russian invaders begin heavy attacks on the Mannerheim line. The Battles of Kollaa and Suomussalmi begin.
7: Italy, Norway and Denmark again declares their neutrality in the Russo-Finnish war. Sweden proclaims "non-belligerency" , by which it could extend military support to Finland, without formally taking part in the war.
11: The Russians meet with several tactical defeats by the Finnish army.
12: The escorting destroyer HMS Duchess sinks after a collision with the battleship HMS Barham off the Mull of Kintyre in the North Channel with the loss of 137 men.
13: The battle of the River Plate off Montevideo, Uruguay. The Royal Navy's hunting group F, composed of three cruisers (and ), attacks off the estuary of the River Plate the German warship Admiral Graf Spee and heavily damage it.
14: The Admiral Graf Spee, badly damaged, sets the anchor into the port of Montevideo, Uruguay, appealing to international law.
14: The USSR is expelled from the League of Nations in response to the Soviet invasion of Finland on November 30.
15: Soviet Army assaults Taipale, Finland during the Battle of Taipale.
17: The Admiral Graf Spee'' is forced by Uruguay to leave Montevideo harbor; given freedom of choice by Berlin the ship's Kapitän zur See Hans Langsdorff orders to scuttle the vessel just outside the harbor. The ship's captain and its crew are interned by Argentinian authorities.
18: The first Canadian troops arrive in Europe.
18: Germany defeats Britain in the Battle of the Heligoland Bight.
20: Captain Hans Langsdorff commits suicide in Argentina.
27: The first Indian troops arrive in France.
28: The British Minister of Food W.S. Morrison announced that starting January 8, rationing would be expanded to include butter, bacon, ham and sugar.
28: While patrolling the Butt of Lewis the British battleship HMS Barham is damaged by the German U-30 and put out of service for four months.
31: German Propaganda Minister Joseph Goebbels makes a radio address reviewing the official Nazi version of the events of 1939. No predictions were made for 1940 other than saying that the next year "will be a hard year, and we must be ready for it."

See also

 Timeline of World War II (1940)

Footnotes

References 

 
 
 
 
 
 
 
 
 
 
 
 
 
 
 
 
 
 
 
 
 
 
 
 
 
 
 
 
 
 
 
 
 
 
 
 
 
 
 
 
 
 
 
 
 
 
 
 
 
 
 

Chronology of World War II
1939 in military history
1939

de:Chronologie des Zweiten Weltkrieges#1939